Gelena Martselievna Velikanova (27 February 1923 – 10 November 1998) was a Soviet traditional pop performer, popular in the 1950s and 1960s, best remembered for her 1959 hit "Landyshi" (Lily of the Valley). Honoured with the People's Artist of Russia title in 1992, Velikanova then lost her voice due to incompetent medical treatment and had to stop performing. She died in 1998, two hours before her farewell concert in Moscow.

Biography
Gelena Velikanova was born in Moscow; both her parents came from Poland, father Marceli Welikanis, was half-Lithuanian. She graduated from the secondary school in 1941, but had to abandon her plans of joining the musical college, due to the outbreak of World War II broke and her family were subsequently evacuated to Tomsk. In 1944 Gelena returned to Moscow, enrolled into the Glazunov Musical college and after the graduation continued her education in the estrada department of the Moscow Art Theater School Studio.

In 1948 Gelena Velikanova debuted as a professional singer. In 1950 she started to perform regularly as a member of the Mosconcert stuff. Soon she turned to more serious music; songs with lyrics based on the poems by Sergey Esenin and Novella Matveyeva, among others, started to appear in her repertoire. Velikanova's musical development has been influenced by her husband, poet Nikolai Dorizo. In 1969 Gelena Velikanova was honoured with the title Meritorious Artist of RSFSR, but soon lost the crystal-clear timbre of her high-pitched voice, due to incompetent medical treatment for her vocal chords. In 1986-1996 she taught at the Gnesin College and in the Russian Academy of Theatre Arts.

In mid-1990s Velikanova enjoyed the renewed interest in her musical legacy. On 16 April 1998, the Velikanova Star was set at the Rossiya concert hall square. On 10 November 1998, the singer was about to give her farewell concert at the Moscow Actor House. She died in her home two hours before the show. She was buried at the Vagankovskoye Cemetery, in Moscow.

References 

1923 births
1998 deaths
Singers from Moscow
People's Artists of Russia
Soviet women singers
Russian women singers
Burials at Vagankovo Cemetery
Honored Artists of the RSFSR
20th-century Russian women singers
20th-century Russian singers